Afropsipyla is a genus of snout moths. It was described by Boris Balinsky in 1994. It contains the species A. pictella from Namibia and A. similis from South Africa.

Species
Afropsipyla pictella Balinsky, 1994
Afropsipyla similis Balinsky, 1994

References

Phycitinae
Moth genera